Heterochrosis is a genus of snout moths. It was described by George Hampson in 1926.

Species
 Heterochrosis molybdophora Lower, 1903
 Heterochrosis oligochrodes Hampson, 1926

References

Phycitini
Pyralidae genera